Taekwondo at the 2020 Summer Olympics in Tokyo featured 128 taekwondo fighters competing in eight weight categories; four for men, and four for women.

Qualification

Taekwondo competition at these Games featured a total of 128 athletes, 64 males and 64 females, and 16 in each of the eight weight categories. Each National Olympic Committee (NOC) was allowed to enter up to one competitor per event, resulting in a maximum of eight competitors, four of each gender. In each weight class, five quota spots were available through World Taekwondo Federation (WTF) Olympic rankings, one quota spot was available through the WT Grand Slam Champions Series, nine quota spots were available through continental qualification events (two per continent, except Oceania with one), and quota spot was available either to the host (four classes chosen by the host, two per gender) or as a Tripartite Commission invitation (the remaining four classes).

If an NOC had qualified at least two female or male athletes through ranking, it could not participate in the respective Continental Qualification Tournament unless it relinquished the places obtained through ranking. This included the host, Japan, with its automatic qualification of two women and two men.

Schedule

Participating

Events by gender

Participating nations

Medal summary

Medal table

Men's events

Women's events

Team event 
 
A team demonstration event with 5 teams is held. Its medal will not be officially calculated. 5 teams were divided into 2 groups. Iran and Japan in one group and China, Ivory Coast and Russian Olympic Committee in the other. Iran won against Japan and China won against its group mates and went to final match. China won against Iran 41–22 in final match.

See also
Taekwondo at the 2019 Pan American Games
Taekwondo at the 2020 Summer Paralympics

References

External links
Results book 

 
Taekwondo competitions in Japan
2020
2020 Summer Olympics events
Olympic